The 1995 NBA Expansion Draft was the tenth expansion draft in the history of the National Basketball Association (NBA). The draft was held on June 24, 1995, so that the newly founded Toronto Raptors and Vancouver Grizzlies could acquire players for the upcoming . Toronto was awarded an expansion team on September 30, 1993, while Vancouver was awarded the league's 29th franchise on April 27, 1994. They were the first NBA teams based in Canada since the  Toronto Huskies.

In an NBA expansion draft, new NBA teams are allowed to acquire players from the previously established teams in the league. Not all players on a given team are available during an expansion draft, since each team can protect a certain number of players from being selected. In this draft, each of the twenty-seven other NBA teams had protected eight players from their roster, and the Raptors and the Grizzlies selected fourteen and thirteen unprotected players respectively, one from each team.

Prior to the draft, the league conducted a coin flip between the Raptors and the Grizzlies to decide their draft order in this expansion draft and in the 1995 NBA draft. The Grizzlies won the coin flip and chose to have the higher pick in the 1995 Draft, allowing the Raptors to receive the first selection and the right to select fourteen players in the expansion draft.

The Raptors were formed and owned by a group headed by Toronto businessman John Bitove. Brendan Malone was hired as the franchise's first head coach. The Raptors used their first pick to select three-time NBA champion B. J. Armstrong from the Chicago Bulls. However, Armstrong refused to report for training and was traded to the Golden State Warriors for five other players. The Raptors' other selections included four-time NBA champion John Salley and six other former first-round picks, Doug Smith, Willie Anderson, Ed Pinckney, Acie Earl, B. J. Tyler and Oliver Miller. Seven players from the expansion draft joined the Raptors for their inaugural season, but only Miller, Earl and Žan Tabak played more than one season for the team. Tabak and Andrés Guibert were the only international players in the draft.

The Grizzlies were formed and owned by Vancouver sports magnate Arthur Griffiths. Former Atlanta Hawks assistant coach Brian Winters was hired as the franchise's first head coach. The Grizzlies used their first pick to select former first-round pick Greg Anthony from the New York Knicks. The Grizzlies' other selections included three-time NBA champion Byron Scott and three other former first-round picks, Benoit Benjamin, Doug Edwards and Blue Edwards. On draft day, the Grizzlies acquired a second-round draft pick from the Orlando Magic in exchange for selecting Rodney Dent, who had never played in the NBA. Eight players from the expansion draft joined the Grizzlies for their inaugural season, but only Anthony and Blue Edwards played more than one season for the team.

Key

Selections

Notes
 Number of years played in the NBA prior to the draft
 Career with the expansion franchise that drafted the player
 Never played a game for the franchise
 Never played in the NBA prior to the expansion draft
 Andrés Guibert defected from Cuba to Puerto Rico in 1993.
 Žan Tabak represented SFR Yugoslavia national team prior to the dissolution of SFR Yugoslavia in 1992.

Trades
Prior to the day of the draft, the following trades were made and resulted in exchanges of future draft picks between the teams, along with a particular agreement in the expansion draft.
 The Vancouver Grizzlies agreed to select Rodney Dent from the Orlando Magic in exchange for a future second-round pick.

References
General

Specific

External links
NBA.com
NBA.com: NBA Draft History

Expansion
Toronto Raptors lists
Memphis Grizzlies lists
National Basketball Association expansion draft
National Basketball Association lists
NBA expansion draft